Jürg Conzett (born 28 September 1956) is a Swiss civil engineer known for designing bridges. After studying at the ETH Zurich and working for architect Peter Zumthor, Conzett started his own civil engineering office in 1988. Perhaps his best known works are a series of three pedestrian bridges located on the  trail of the Viamala in Switzerland. Though many of Conzett's works are in Switzerland, he has designed bridges elsewhere.

Biography
Jürg Conzett was born on 28 September 1956 in Aarau, Canton of Aargau, Switzerland. His father was a surveyor. Conzett cites Swiss cartographer Eduard Imhof as an early influence. He is also interested in and inspired by the Baroque, such as works by the Grubenmann brothers, 18th-century Swiss engineers.

In 1975 Conzett began studying civil engineering at the École Polytechnique Fédérale de Lausanne and ETH Zurich, gaining his diploma in 1980. From 1980 until 1987 he worked in the office of Swiss architect Peter Zumthor.

In 1988 Conzett started his own civil engineering office in Haldenstein. In 1992 the office became Branger & Conzett AG, and in 1996 Branger Conzett und Partner AG. In 1998 Conzett partnered with Gianfranco Bronzini and Patrick Gartmann to form Conzett Bronzini Gartmann AG in Chur. Gartmann left the firm in 2015, and its name changed to Conzett Bronzini Partner AG. Conzett is Chairman of the Board of Directors and in charge of building and bridge construction projects at Conzett Bronzini Partner AG.

Between 1987 and 2004 he lectured on timber construction at the Fachhochschule Graubünden (Graubünden University of Applied Sciences). In 2015 he was a visiting professor at Harvard University Graduate School of Design.

Works
Perhaps Conzett's best known works are a series of three pedestrian bridges located on the  trail of the Viamala. The first was a  wood-and-rope truss bridge known as the Traversinersteg I, completed in 1996 but destroyed in a March 1999 rockslide. The first Traversinersteg was prefabricated as a single assembly and lifted into place by what was then Switzerland's most powerful helicopter. The second bridge—Traversinersteg II, a wood and steel cable suspension bridge with large concrete abutments that spans  vertically and  horizontally—replaced the first in 2005. The third is a  granite slab and steel cable stressed ribbon bridge called Pùnt da Suransans located near Thusis. Built in 1999, the Pùnt da Suransans crosses the Hinterrhein River in the shadow of the Great Viamala Bridge, a viaduct of the A13 motorway designed by Christian Menn.

Though many of Conzett's works are in Switzerland, he has designed bridges elsewhere. One such bridge— a pedestrian and cycle vertical-lift bridge spanning  over the Coupure canal in Bruges, Belgium, and built in 2002—was even named the Conzettbrug in his honor.

Conzett collaborates with architects and other building professionals on building projects. One such project is St Benedict's Chapel, Sumvitg, with his colleague Jürg Buchli, according to the design of architect Peter Zumthor. Another noteworthy project is the Mehrzweckhalle Vrin, a multipurpose hall built in Vrin in 1995 and designed in collaboration with architect Gion A. Caminada. Another is a school building in Grono designed with architect Raphael Zuber or the collaboration with the Austrian office Cukrowicz Nachbaur Architekten for a music center in Liechtenstein.

Awards
 2001: Auszeichnungen für gute Bauten Graubünden
 2021: Auszeichnungen für gute Bauten Graubünden

References

Further reading

External links
Jürg Conzett's CV at Conzett Bronzini Partner AG (in German)
Profile on Structurae

Bridge engineers
Swiss civil engineers
1956 births
Living people
People from Aarau